Flaminio Bottoni (born 4 August 1881, date of death unknown) was an Italian gymnast. He competed in the men's team event at the 1908 Summer Olympics.

References

1881 births
Year of death missing
Italian male artistic gymnasts
Olympic gymnasts of Italy
Gymnasts at the 1908 Summer Olympics
Place of birth missing